Naoyuki (written: 直之, 直行, 直幸, 尚幸, 尚之, 尚志, 尚往 or なおゆき in hiragana) is a masculine Japanese given name. Notable people with the name include:

, Japanese lawyer, diplomat, academic and writer
, Japanese samurai
, Japanese high jumper
, Japanese footballer
, Japanese writer
, Japanese anime director
, Japanese manga artist
, Japanese illustrator
, Japanese art historian
, Japanese mixed martial artist
, Japanese daimyō
, Japanese samurai and politician
, Japanese sailor
, Japanese baseball player
, Japanese pool player
, Japanese baseball player
, Japanese film director and screenwriter
, Japanese baseball player
, Japanese footballer
, Japanese footballer

Japanese masculine given names